Beech Bend is an amusement park, campground and automobile race track located in Warren County, in the U.S. state of Kentucky, just outside the limits of the city of Bowling Green.

History
The park takes its name from a bend in Barren River where stands of beech trees are scattered throughout the area. The area was used for picnics as early as the 1880s. Charles Garvin purchased the park property in the early 1940s, adding amusements both rides and recreational activities over the years. The first ride was a pony ride, followed by a roller skating rink, dance hall, bowling center and swimming pool.

Mechanics arrive
Shortly after World War II, Garvin added mechanical rides to Beech Bend Park, beginning with a Ferris wheel purchased from the Chicago World's Fair. Racing began about that same time with motorcycles. Auto racing began on a 3/8-mile (600 m) oval dirt track; that same track, now paved, is still in use today. A dragstrip was added in the 1950s.

The 1960s
The 1960s marked the park's heyday. Gate admission was ten cents, with promotions known as "County Days," spotlighting a county within the Bowling Green, Kentucky area each week. Carnival-type rides were abundant, with the famous Wild Mouse the most popular; midway games such as Skee ball and Fascination were a hit with guests. The campground grew over the years, with more than 1,000 spaces advertised at its peak, billed at one time as the world's largest. (The campground was home to the original store of what is now Camping World, a large camping supply retailer founded by David Garvin, Charles Garvin's son.) A small zoo was also added.

The 1970s and early 1980s
In the 1970s, the park went into a state of decline, largely due to competition from theme parks such as Opryland USA in nearby Nashville, Tennessee. Garvin's health was also in steady decline. When he died in 1979, the park closed, though the racing facilities stayed open under a lease agreement to a third-party operator. The park was purchased by an ownership group that included country music singer Ronnie Milsap, which operated it in 1981 and 1982.

Jim Varney's first television commercial as character Ernest P. Worrell was for Beech Bend. Varney's character was advertising an appearance by the Dallas Cowboys Cheerleaders in 1980.

The park closed again, with ownership reverting to Garvin's heirs.

Changes
In 1984, Dallas and Alfreda Jones purchased the racetracks and began hosting national drag racing events sanctioned by the National Hot Rod Association. The racetracks did well, and three years later, the couple purchased the rest of the park, which had by then fallen back into nature. No work was done on the old park until the 1990s, when the Jones' began to clear out the park and renovate the campground. In 1998 the pool was reopened along with some new amusement rides being added to the park — much as Charles Garvin had done in the park's early years. It hosts the annual National Hot Rod Reunion.

Recent history
In 2001, the park introduced the Looping Star roller coaster, which was 31-feet tall and 1,202 feet-long. The Gold Rush Miniature Golf course was added to the park for the 2003 season. In late 2002, construction began on Splash Lagoon water park, which included the existing olympic-sized swimming and added the Ragin' Rapids Water Slides, and Lotta Wotta Island, a children's play structure. The water park was originally scheduled to open in 2003, however its grand opening was postponed, and Splash Lagoon opened on May 22, 2004. By 2005, Beech Bend Park had more than 40 rides, 500 campground spaces with modern amenities, renovated racing facilities, a water park and large picnic pavilions. The race tracks were hosting numerous Corvette racing events (the park is only a few miles away from the General Motors factory that produces the sports car), plus the annual NHRA Hot Rod Reunion. The park opened a Zamperla Twisting Wild Mouse coaster, Zamperla Steamboat ride and a drop tower called the Shock Drop for the 2005 season.

In November 2004, during the IAAPA trade show in Orlando, Florida, Dallas Jones began discussions with Great Coasters International about constructing a wooden roller coaster at Beech Bend Park. On October 28, 2005, the park announced that the ride would be called Kentucky Rumbler. The roller coaster opened on May 6, 2006.

The year 2007 brought permanent replacements for some of the older mobile rides. In October the park announced the Holiday Lights Spectacular that ran through January. The Kentucky Rumbler was operating along with other smaller flat rides open.

In 2008, the park added a brand new Carousel, The Grand Carousel. A new show called "The Magic of Music" involved music from the 1960s, 1970s and 1980s. They also had Cirque Africa Show that ran June 16 through June 23. For the kids the park introduced a new park character show, "Singing with Sammy the Squirrel, and from July 14 through July 23 the park had a kids' festival. Thrill seekers received a brand new Scat 2.

In 2009, Beech Bend debuted the Chance Rides Sea Dragon ride  which was purchased from Michael Jackson's Neverland Ranch and was alleged to be his favorite ride. The Looping Star Roller Coaster was removed at the end of the season.

In 2010, Beech Bend opened a large waterpark expansion (wave pool, lazy river and a water play structure), a Zamperla family tea cups ride, a kids' quad runner and a new amphitheater, billed as the largest in Beech Bend's history and was to open in early May. The expansion was delayed by two months due to the 2010 Tennessee floods, and the water play structure and amphitheater did not open until the 2011 season. The first ride at the park, the Ferris wheel, was standing but not operating the whole season, and was removed for the 2011 season.

In 2011, the old Haunted House ride was completely overhauled, with new effects and cars added to it. The Shock Drop drop tower was removed at the end of the season.

The replacement for Shock Drop arrived in 2012, in the form of the 140-foot-tall drop tower named Zero-G, named by people who participated in a naming contest on Facebook. Ironically, Zero-G was made by the same manufacturer as Shock Drop was; ARM. As well as the park purchased new ThunderVolt Speedway Go-Karts.

In 2013, the Park added the Vortex manufactured by Chance Rides. The Vortex is swinging pendulum ride that swings riders 60 feet into the air reaching a maximum swing angle of 240 degrees. Riders sit facing each other, and at the maximum height of the swing, riders are suspended upside down.

In 2014, no new rides were added, but several of the older rides were repainted and rebuilt.

In 2015, the park added 5 new rides. The Tornado and Sizzler rides were replaced with new versions. Power Surge was replaced by Air Race, as well as the park added a children's monster truck ride, and Bluegrass Breeze a Flying Carousel make their way to Beech Bend for the 2015 season. On August 15, a train on the Dragon coaster derailed, leading to the ride's removal.

For the 2016 year, Beech Bend invested in a multimillion-dollar expansion to the water park, involving four new slides manufactured by ProSlide. One slide, the Cyclone Saucers, is the first of its kind in North America. Because of the expansion, several rides had to be relocated. Spinning Out, a spinning family coaster, was also added in 2016, taking the place of the Dragon Coaster.

In 2022, the park replaced it aging Flying Bobs with a more modern ride of the same type dubbed Thunderbolt. The ride, a portable model like its predecessor, was relocated from Rye Playland.

On February 25th, 2023 park owner Dallas Jones passed away.

Current attractions

Roller coasters

Family and thrill rides

Kiddie rides

Water Park Attractions

Removed Rides

References

External links
 Beech Bend Park official web site
 Beech Bend Park Photos and Information

Tourist attractions in Bowling Green, Kentucky
Amusement parks in Kentucky
1898 establishments in Kentucky
NHRA Division 3 drag racing venues
Buildings and structures in Warren County, Kentucky
Tourist attractions in Warren County, Kentucky